Milavčići is a village situated in Kraljevo municipality in Serbia.

References

Populated places in Raška District